Zhu Derun(1294–1365), Zemin by style name, Suiyang Shanren by pseudonym, was a Chinese painter and poet in Yuan Dynasty. He was a native of Suiyang (now Shangqiu), Henan Province, and later lived in Suzhou. He was at one time the editor at the national academy of history, and also served as academic director in Zhendong Province, and supervisor in Jiangzhe Province.

He excelled in calligraphy, following the styles of Zhao Mengfu and Wang Xizhi, utilizing strong and bold brushstrokes. He was also an expert of landscape painting, and inherited the techniques of Xu Daoning and Guo Xi. His paintings typically boasted distant mountains, sturdy peaks and robust trees. The mountain stones were depicted by cirrus-cloud brushstrokes, and the branches of trees simulated crab claws, with realistic beauty. Preserved works include Pavilion of Elegant Plain, Playing Lyre under the Trees, and Boating on the Pine Creek.

He was renowned for his poems too. Most of his works portrayed landscapes and items. Some accused the unjust society, such as "People were not born villains. The oppressive government coerced them into crimes." He authored Collected Works of Cunfu Studio, 10 columns plus one supplement.

Notes

References
Ci hai bian ji wei yuan hui. Ci hai . Shanghai: Shanghai ci shu chu ban she , 1979.
Barnhart, R. M. et al. (1997). Three thousand years of Chinese painting. New Haven, Yale University Press. 

1294 births
1365 deaths
Yuan dynasty painters
Yuan dynasty calligraphers
Writers from Shangqiu
Yuan dynasty poets
Painters from Henan
Poets from Henan
14th-century Chinese calligraphers